This is a list of diplomatic missions of North Macedonia, excluding honorary consulates.

Africa

 Cairo (Embassy)

Americas

 Brasília (Embassy)

 Ottawa (Embassy)
 Toronto (Consulate General)

 Washington, D.C. (Embassy)
 Chicago (Consulate-General)
 Detroit (Consulate General)
 Ridgefield Park (Consulate General)

Asia

 Beijing (Embassy)

 New Delhi (Embassy)

 Tel Aviv (Embassy)

 Tokyo (Embassy)

 Astana (Embassy)

 Doha (Embassy)

 Ankara (Embassy)
 Istanbul (Consulate General)

 Abu Dhabi (Embassy)

Europe

 Tirana (Embassy)

 Vienna (Embassy)

 Brussels (Embassy)

 Sarajevo (Embassy)

 Sofia (Embassy)

 Zagreb (Embassy)

 Prague (Embassy)

 Copenhagen (Embassy)
 
 Tallinn (Embassy)

 Paris (Embassy)

 Berlin (Embassy)
 Bonn (Branch Office)
 Hamburg (Consulate General)
 Munich (Consulate General)

Athens (Embassy)
 Thessaloniki (Consulate General)

 Rome (Embassy)

 Budapest (Embassy)

 Rome (Embassy)
 Venice (Consulate General)

 Pristina (Embassy)
 
 Podgorica (Embassy)

 The Hague (Embassy)

 Oslo (Embassy)

 Warsaw (Embassy)

 Bucharest (Embassy)

 Moscow (Embassy)

 Belgrade (Embassy)

 Ljubljana (Embassy)

Bratislava (Embassy)

 Madrid (Embassy)

 Stockholm (Embassy)

 Bern (Embassy)

 Kyiv (Embassy)

 London (Embassy)

Oceania

 Canberra (Embassy)
 Melbourne (Consulate General)

Multilateral organizations
 Brussels (Permanent Mission to the European Union and NATO)
 Geneva (Permanent Mission to the United Nations and international organizations)
 New York City (Permanent Mission to the United Nations)
 Paris (Permanent Mission to UNESCO)
 Rome (Permanent Mission to Food and Agriculture Organization)
 Strasbourg (Permanent Mission to the Council of Europe)
 Vienna (Permanent Mission to Organization for Security and Co-operation in Europe)

Gallery

See also

List of diplomatic missions in North Macedonia
Foreign relations of North Macedonia

Notes

References

Ministry of Foreign Affairs - Diplomatic Representation

North Macedonia
Diplomatic missions